André Noël (born 29 September 1932) is a French former sports shooter. He competed at the 1968 Summer Olympics and the 1972 Summer Olympics.

References

1932 births
Living people
French male sport shooters
Olympic shooters of France
Shooters at the 1968 Summer Olympics
Shooters at the 1972 Summer Olympics
Sportspeople from Aube